The Close to the Edge Tour was a concert tour by progressive rock band Yes in promotion of their 1972 album, Close to the Edge.  Lasting from 30 July 1972 until 22 April 1973, and including 97 performances, the tour began at the Dallas Memorial Auditorium, and ended at the West Palm Beach Auditorium in West Palm Beach, Florida. The tour was Alan White's first with the band.

Recordings from the tour—both film and audio—were included on the band's 1973 live album, Yessongs.  The filmed performance was recorded at the December 1972 shows at the London Rainbow Theatre.

Recordings 
Eleven songs from the tour (with no information about recording dates or locations) were included on the band's 1973 live album, Yessongs—the excerpt from Stravinsky's Firebird Suite, "Siberian Khatru", "Heart of the Sunrise", "And You and I", "Mood for a Day", excerpts from Wakeman's The Six Wives of Henry VIII, "Roundabout", "I've Seen All Good People", "Close to the Edge", "Yours Is No Disgrace", and "Starship Trooper".

Film footage of the 15–16 December 1972 shows at the London Rainbow Theatre was the source of the 1975 film Yessongs. Fans determined that "Close to the Edge" and "Starship Trooper" from the film were the same versions from the 1973 album. With the release in 2015 of the box set Progeny: Seven Shows from Seventy-Two containing concert recordings from between 31 October and 20 November 1972, in Canada and the United States, it became possible to identify the dates of most of the remaining performances from the album.

Members 
The line-up for the tour unchanged throughout its duration; the line-up was the seventh incarnation of Yes. Bill Bruford left the band on 19 July 1972, after the recording sessions for Close to the Edge had finished.  Alan White joined the band by the end of the month, after a number of dates had been cancelled in the wake of Bruford's departure.  As he played on the album but was replaced for the tour Bruford was contractually obliged to share album royalties with White, and claims that Yes manager Brian Lane enforced a compensation payment of $10,000 from Bruford.

 Jon Anderson — lead vocals
 Steve Howe — guitars and backing vocals
 Chris Squire — bass and backing vocals
 Rick Wakeman — keyboards
 Alan White — drums

Tour 
The tour saw the band play a total of 97 concerts in the United States, Canada, the United Kingdom, Japan and Australia over seven legs—three North American legs, two European legs, an Asian leg and an Australasian leg.

Support came from Eagles, Gentle Giant, Edgar Winter, Lindisfarne, Mahavishnu Orchestra, Gary Wright, The J Geils Band,  Wild Turkey, Badger, and Focus.

 Setlist 
Setlist:

 "Siberian Khatru" (Anderson, Howe, Wakeman)
 "I've Seen All Good People" (Anderson, Squire)
 "Heart of the Sunrise" (Anderson, Squire, Bruford)
 "Clap/Mood for a Day" (Howe)
 "America" (Paul Simon) (Dropped after 2 August 1972)
 "And You and I" (Anderson, Howe, Bruford, Squire)
 "Close to the Edge" (Anderson, Howe) (Added starting on 2 September 1972)
 Keyboards solo (Excerpts from The Six Wives of Henry VIII) (Wakeman) 
 "Roundabout" (Anderson, Howe)
Encore:
 "Yours Is No Disgrace" (Anderson, Squire, Howe, Kaye, Bruford)
 "Starship Trooper" (Anderson, Squire, Howe) (Added starting on 15 December 1972)
Occasionally played:
 Keyboards solo (Excerpts from The Six Wives on Henry VIII) (Wakeman) (Played on 1 August 1972, 29 September 1972, 14, 15 November 1972, 16 December 1972)
 "South Side of the Sky" (Played on 8 April 1973)
 "Perpetual Change" (Played on 1 August 1972)
 "The Fish (Schindleria Praematurus)" (Played on 1 August 1972, 22 September 1972)
 "Long Distance Runaround" (Played on 1 August 1972, 22 September 1972)
 "Can and Brahms" (Played on 19, 21, 23, 26, 27, March 1973)
Covers: 
 "The Beautiful Land" (Played on 9 March 1973)
 "Tie Me Kangaroo Down Sport" (Played on 19, 23, 26 March 1973) 
 "Sakura Sakura" (Played on 10, 11, 12, 14 March 1973)
 "America" (Played on 30, 31 July 1972, 2, 20 August 1972)
 "Waltzing Matilda" (Played on 19 March 1973) 
 "Colors Of The Rainbow" 

 Tour dates 

 Cancelled shows 
The tour's first four scheduled shows were cancelled in the wake of Bill Bruford's resignation from the band.  When Alan White was confirmed as a member, the tour began at the fifth scheduled show on 30 July 1972.
A whole leg, covering South America, was cancelled. Dates and venues were never released, except for the scheduled performance at the Salle University in Acapulco on 1 May 1973.

References 

1972 concert tours
1973 concert tours
Yes (band) concert tours